Maigret and the Burglar's Wife (French: Maigret et la Grande Perche) is a 1951 detective novel by the Belgian writer Georges Simenon featuring his character Jules Maigret. Maigret is spurred into action by a visit from a burglar's wife, whom he had known well many years before. She informs him that a few nights previously her husband had been in the act of burgling a house when he discovered a dead body on the floor. Horrified, he had fled the scene, and then left the country - writing to his wife by letter. Maigret is inclined to investigate a prominent dentist, who lives with his domineering mother, and has a wife who has apparently "gone away on holiday" - although Maigret knows he can prove nothing unless he can find the body.

It was translated into English and released in the United Kingdom in 1956.

Adaptations
It has been adapted several times for television. In 1992 it was made into an episode of an ITV Maigret series.

References

1951 Belgian novels
Maigret novels
Presses de la Cité books